The Kostroma constituency (No. 107) is a Russian legislative constituency covering the entirety of Kostroma Oblast.

Members elected

Election results

1993

|-
! colspan=2 style="background-color:#E9E9E9;text-align:left;vertical-align:top;" |Candidate
! style="background-color:#E9E9E9;text-align:left;vertical-align:top;" |Party
! style="background-color:#E9E9E9;text-align:right;" |Votes
! style="background-color:#E9E9E9;text-align:right;" |%
|-
|style="background-color:#78866B"|
|align=left|Adrian Puzanovsky
|align=left|Dignity and Charity
|
|33.01%
|-
|style="background-color:"|
|align=left|Aleksandr Voronin
|align=left|Independent
| -
|18.32%
|-
| colspan="5" style="background-color:#E9E9E9;"|
|- style="font-weight:bold"
| colspan="3" style="text-align:left;" | Total
| 
| 100%
|-
| colspan="5" style="background-color:#E9E9E9;"|
|- style="font-weight:bold"
| colspan="4" |Source:
|
|}

1995

|-
! colspan=2 style="background-color:#E9E9E9;text-align:left;vertical-align:top;" |Candidate
! style="background-color:#E9E9E9;text-align:left;vertical-align:top;" |Party
! style="background-color:#E9E9E9;text-align:right;" |Votes
! style="background-color:#E9E9E9;text-align:right;" |%
|-
|style="background-color:"|
|align=left|Adrian Puzanovsky (incumbent)
|align=left|Agrarian Party
|
|26.95%
|-
|style="background-color:"|
|align=left|Anatoly Sidorov
|align=left|Liberal Democratic Party
|
|9.26%
|-
|style="background-color:#F21A29"|
|align=left|Viktor Gulyashko
|align=left|Trade Unions and Industrialists – Union of Labour
|
|6.94%
|-
|style="background-color:"|
|align=left|Igor Smirnov
|align=left|Independent
|
|6.81%
|-
|style="background-color:"|
|align=left|Valentin Mamontov
|align=left|Our Home – Russia
|
|6.38%
|-
|style="background-color:"|
|align=left|Galina Zaikina
|align=left|Independent
|
|6.07%
|-
|style="background-color:"|
|align=left|Vladimir Voronin
|align=left|Russian Union of Local Self-Government
|
|5.28%
|-
|style="background-color:"|
|align=left|Andrey Lutchenkov
|align=left|Independent
|
|4.71%
|-
|style="background-color:"|
|align=left|Yury Timoshenko
|align=left|Independent
|
|4.27%
|-
|style="background-color:"|
|align=left|Alvin Yeryomin
|align=left|Power to the People!
|
|3.62%
|-
|style="background-color:"|
|align=left|Aleksandr Kulkov
|align=left|Independent
|
|2.10%
|-
|style="background-color:#295EC4"|
|align=left|Aleksandr Gotovtsev
|align=left|Party of Economic Freedom
|
|2.07%
|-
|style="background-color:"|
|align=left|Aleksandr Sutyagin
|align=left|Political Movement of Transport Workers
|
|1.60%
|-
|style="background-color:"|
|align=left|Valery Vdovichev
|align=left|Independent
|
|1.34%
|-
|style="background-color:#000000"|
|colspan=2 |against all
|
|10.04%
|-
| colspan="5" style="background-color:#E9E9E9;"|
|- style="font-weight:bold"
| colspan="3" style="text-align:left;" | Total
| 
| 100%
|-
| colspan="5" style="background-color:#E9E9E9;"|
|- style="font-weight:bold"
| colspan="4" |Source:
|
|}

1999

|-
! colspan=2 style="background-color:#E9E9E9;text-align:left;vertical-align:top;" |Candidate
! style="background-color:#E9E9E9;text-align:left;vertical-align:top;" |Party
! style="background-color:#E9E9E9;text-align:right;" |Votes
! style="background-color:#E9E9E9;text-align:right;" |%
|-
|style="background-color:"|
|align=left|Adrian Puzanovsky (incumbent)
|align=left|Independent
|
|18.07%
|-
|style="background-color:#3B9EDF"|
|align=left|Andrey Bychkov
|align=left|Fatherland – All Russia
|
|16.01%
|-
|style="background-color:"|
|align=left|Irina Pereverzeva
|align=left|Independent
|
|14.41%
|-
|style="background-color:"|
|align=left|Valentina Yamshchikova
|align=left|Yabloko
|
|12.29%
|-
|style="background-color:"|
|align=left|Pavel Romanets
|align=left|Independent
|
|8.21%
|-
|style="background-color:"|
|align=left|Andrey Lutchenkov
|align=left|Independent
|
|8.15%
|-
|style="background-color:"|
|align=left|Anatoly Mishanov
|align=left|Independent
|
|7.01%
|-
|style="background-color:"|
|align=left|Yevgeny Onegin
|align=left|Kedr
|
|2.62%
|-
|style="background-color:#000000"|
|colspan=2 |against all
|
|11.69%
|-
| colspan="5" style="background-color:#E9E9E9;"|
|- style="font-weight:bold"
| colspan="3" style="text-align:left;" | Total
| 
| 100%
|-
| colspan="5" style="background-color:#E9E9E9;"|
|- style="font-weight:bold"
| colspan="4" |Source:
|
|}

2003

|-
! colspan=2 style="background-color:#E9E9E9;text-align:left;vertical-align:top;" |Candidate
! style="background-color:#E9E9E9;text-align:left;vertical-align:top;" |Party
! style="background-color:#E9E9E9;text-align:right;" |Votes
! style="background-color:#E9E9E9;text-align:right;" |%
|-
|style="background-color:"|
|align=left|Yevgeny Trepov
|align=left|United Russia
|
|28.35%
|-
|style="background-color:"|
|align=left|Sergey Komissarov
|align=left|Independent
|
|20.90%
|-
|style="background-color:#FFD700"|
|align=left|Vladimir Mikhaylov
|align=left|People's Party
|
|11.15%
|-
|style="background-color:"|
|align=left|Mikhail Vasin
|align=left|Independent
|
|10.05%
|-
|style="background-color:"|
|align=left|Sard Sardarov
|align=left|Independent
|
|5.47%
|-
|style="background-color:#00A1FF"|
|align=left|Marina Gordeyeva
|align=left|Party of Russia's Rebirth-Russian Party of Life
|
|5.11%
|-
|style="background-color: "|
|align=left|Aleksandr Chuyev
|align=left|Rodina
|
|3.89%
|-
|style="background-color:"|
|align=left|Mikhail Karlashov
|align=left|Liberal Democratic Party
|
|1.98%
|-
|style="background-color:"|
|align=left|Leonid Storozhev
|align=left|Yabloko
|
|1.63%
|-
|style="background-color:#164C8C"|
|align=left|Anatoly Zaytsev
|align=left|United Russian Party Rus'
|
|0.63%
|-
|style="background-color:#000000"|
|colspan=2 |against all
|
|9.40%
|-
| colspan="5" style="background-color:#E9E9E9;"|
|- style="font-weight:bold"
| colspan="3" style="text-align:left;" | Total
| 
| 100%
|-
| colspan="5" style="background-color:#E9E9E9;"|
|- style="font-weight:bold"
| colspan="4" |Source:
|
|}

2016

|-
! colspan=2 style="background-color:#E9E9E9;text-align:left;vertical-align:top;" |Candidate
! style="background-color:#E9E9E9;text-align:leftt;vertical-align:top;" |Party
! style="background-color:#E9E9E9;text-align:right;" |Votes
! style="background-color:#E9E9E9;text-align:right;" |%
|-
| style="background-color: " |
|align=left|Aleksey Sitnikov
|align=left|United Russia
|
|38.12%
|-
|style="background-color:"|
|align=left|Valery Izhitsky
|align=left|Communist Party
|
|24.43%
|-
|style="background-color:"|
|align=left|Ruslan Fedorov
|align=left|Liberal Democratic Party
|
|9.85%
|-
|style="background:"| 
|align=left|Aleksandr Plyusnin
|align=left|A Just Russia
|
|7.78%
|-
|style="background-color: "|
|align=left|Yevgeny Trepov
|align=left|Rodina
|
|6.47%
|-
|style="background:"| 
|align=left|Vladimir Mikhaylov
|align=left|Yabloko
|
|5.73%
|-
|style="background:"| 
|align=left|Vladimir Sabelnikov
|align=left|Communists of Russia
|
|1.83%
|-
|style="background:"| 
|align=left|Aleksey Postnikov
|align=left|Party of Growth
|
|1.64%
|-
|style="background-color:"|
|align=left|Aleksandr Bakanov
|align=left|The Greens
|
|1.33%
|-
| colspan="5" style="background-color:#E9E9E9;"|
|- style="font-weight:bold"
| colspan="3" style="text-align:left;" | Total
| 
| 100%
|-
| colspan="5" style="background-color:#E9E9E9;"|
|- style="font-weight:bold"
| colspan="4" |Source:
|
|}

2021

|-
! colspan=2 style="background-color:#E9E9E9;text-align:left;vertical-align:top;" |Candidate
! style="background-color:#E9E9E9;text-align:left;vertical-align:top;" |Party
! style="background-color:#E9E9E9;text-align:right;" |Votes
! style="background-color:#E9E9E9;text-align:right;" |%
|-
|style="background-color:"|
|align=left|Aleksey Sitnikov (incumbent)
|align=left|United Russia
|
|36.91%
|-
|style="background-color:"|
|align=left|Valery Izhitsky
|align=left|Communist Party
|
|29.04%
|-
|style="background-color: " |
|align=left|Vyacheslav Golovnikov
|align=left|A Just Russia — For Truth
|
|9.62%
|-
|style="background-color: "|
|align=left|Dmitry Fedin
|align=left|New People
|
|5.22%
|-
|style="background-color: "|
|align=left|Andrey Kuznetsov
|align=left|Party of Pensioners
|
|5.12%
|-
|style="background-color:"|
|align=left|Ruslan Fedorov
|align=left|Liberal Democratic Party
|
|5.02%
|-
|style="background-color: " |
|align=left|Aleksandr Lazutin
|align=left|Yabloko
|
|1.96%
|-
|style="background-color: "|
|align=left|Vladimir Salnikov
|align=left|Rodina
|
|1.41%
|-
|style="background-color: "|
|align=left|Valery Kirsanov
|align=left|Civic Platform
|
|1.26%
|-
|style="background:"| 
|align=left|Andrey Shishov
|align=left|Party of Growth
|
|0.99%
|-
| colspan="5" style="background-color:#E9E9E9;"|
|- style="font-weight:bold"
| colspan="3" style="text-align:left;" | Total
| 
| 100%
|-
| colspan="5" style="background-color:#E9E9E9;"|
|- style="font-weight:bold"
| colspan="4" |Source:
|
|}

Notes

References

Russian legislative constituencies
Politics of Kostroma Oblast